Brewster is a small lunar impact crater in the northern fringes of Sinus Amoris. It was named after the Scottish scientist, Sir David Brewster. Its diameter is 9.8 km. It lies to the southwest of the larger crater Römer. To the southeast of Brewster is the similar-sized Franck. This crater is cup-shaped and symmetrical, with no overlapping craters of note. A low ridge is attached to the northern rim. The crater interior has a relatively high interior albedo compared to the surrounding terrain.

References

External links
 LTO-43D1 Littrow — L&PI topographic map

Impact craters on the Moon